Mohammed Sarwar (1967 – January 27, 2012), known as Maulvi Ghulam Sarwar or other variations, was a Pakistani murderer and suspected serial killer who was convicted and sentenced to death for killing politician and activist Zille Huma Usman in 2007. His case gained notoriety due to the fact that Sarwar had been acquitted under controversial circumstances for killing at least four prostitutes years prior, which he claimed had done because they had broken Islamic law. He died in prison in 2012 while still awaiting for his execution.

Early life
Mohammed Sarwar was born in Gujranwala in 1967. While little is known of his upbringing, his neighbors claimed that he was greatly influenced by his mother, a very religious woman who strictly adhered to the Ahl-i Hadith sect's teachings and observed purdah. After graduating from PB Model School, he attended various madrasas and eventually became a preacher who taught at local mosques. He lived with his wife and nine children in the district of Baghbanpura.

When he was not preaching, Sarwar ran a small store in the Daal Bazaar, where he was noted for refusing to sell any merchandise to women who did not wear the hijab. He also regularly attended sermons by Hafiz Saeed, the founder of Lashkar-e-Taiba, but it is unclear whether he was a member of the organization itself. Despite this, the only time Sarwar got into trouble before his killings was on two occasions, where he fired a gun into the air to scare off eunuchs who were attempting to hold celebrations near his home.

Murders and acquittal
Between November 3, 2002 and January 2003, at least four prostitutes were killed in Gujranwala and Lahore, and several others left injured or permanently damaged from the attacks. The perpetrator's modus operandi was to either shoot or stab the victims just above the crotch, and then leave them to bleed out. In early 2003, Sarwar was arrested and charged with the murders, proudly proclaiming that he had killed at least twelve women in these several months because they were "immoral" and went against the teachings of Islam.

Despite his detailed confessions and evidence pointing towards his guilt, the case collapsed and he was acquitted on all charges, with the verdict celebrated by his supporters. The police later released a statement claiming that this decision came about since the victims' family members had accepted diyāt and that Sarwar was diagnosed by a prison psychiatrist as "normal, but religiously fanatical." This came under heavy scrutiny by parts of the media and the less radically Islamic sections of the country, who claimed that the family members and witnesses were intimidated into dropping the charges by wealthy patrons and members of the local clergy who supported Sarwar's extremist views, and had even helped him set up business as a locksmith after his release. Later on, Sarwar's own lawyer, Liaqat Sindhu, revealed that he himself knew his client was guilty, but said that the acquittal was the result of a lack of strong evidence and mishandling by the prosecution.

Murder of Zille Huma Usman
On February 20, 2007, Sarwar attended a gathering in Gujranwala held by Zille Huma Usman, the then-Provincial Minister for Social Welfare, who was addressing her party members about new policices. Shortly after asking her why she was not wearing a proper Islamic dress, he pulled out a gun and shot Usman in the head, causing her severe injuries that later led to her death at a hospital. After the shooting, Sarwar calmly stood and allowed himself to be arrested by authorities, proclaiming that he was just "doing his duty" by cleansing the world of immoral women. In the aftermath of the murder, police launched an investigation to see whether he had any connections to extremist Islamic groups, but none such links were found.

The killing was immediately condemned by President Pervez Musharraf, Prime Minister Shaukat Aziz and multiple members of Parliament, with one female senator demanding that at least one of Sarwar's female relatives be murdered in retaliation. Religious scholars and leaders also condemned the killing, but claimed that they were not related to Sarwar's previous murder charges and that the killing was either ordered by a hostile foreign state or committed during a spell of insanity.

Trial, imprisonment and death
Shortly after the killing, Sarwar was charged with Usman's murder before the Anti Terrorism Court, to which he pleaded not guilty. He was convicted on March 21, with presiding Justice Tariq Iftikhar sentencing him to death, in addition to handing a large fine.

After his conviction, Sarwar was sent to Central Jail Lahore to await execution. Over the years, he began suffering from tuberculosis, which gradually worsened until his eventual death on January 27, 2012. There were allegations by some police officials that the manner in which he died was highly suspicious, but this has never been confirmed with certainty.

References

1967 births
2012 deaths
21st-century criminals
21st-century deaths from tuberculosis
Ahl-i Hadith people
Pakistani Muslims
Pakistani people convicted of murder
Pakistani people who died in prison custody
Pakistani prisoners sentenced to death
People acquitted of murder
People convicted of murder by Pakistan
People from Gujranwala
Prisoners sentenced to death by Pakistan
Prisoners who died in Pakistani detention
Suspected serial killers
Tuberculosis deaths in Pakistan
Violence against women in Pakistan